Reading Recovery is a discredited short-term intervention approach designed for English speaking children aged five or six, who are the lowest achieving in literacy after their first year of school. For instance, a child who is unable to read the simplest of books or write their own name, after a year in school, would be appropriate for a referral to a Reading Recovery program. The intervention involves intensive one-to-one lessons for 30 minutes a day with a teacher trained in the Reading Recovery method, for between 12 and 20 weeks.

Reading Recovery was developed in the 1970s by New Zealand educator Marie Clay. After lengthy observations of early readers, Clay defined reading as a message-getting, problem-solving activity, and writing as a message-sending, problem-solving activity. Clay suggested that both activities involved linking invisible patterns of oral language with visible symbols.  The approach has come under increasing scrutiny in the 21st century, as research has shown it to be ineffective.

Reading Recovery Use and Practice
"Reading Recovery" is in use in a number of English-speaking countries. The phrase "Reading Recovery" is a proprietary registered trademark held by the Marie Clay Trust in New Zealand, with Ohio State University in the US and the Institute of Education in the UK. The Marie Clay Trust and the International Reading Recovery Trainers Organization (IRRTO) licenses use of the title Reading Recovery to affiliated entities around the world.

Australia

In 2015, a report from the New South Wales Department of Education, concluded that Reading Recovery was largely ineffective, and should not be used for most children. As a result, in 2016, Reading Recovery lost its "mandated status" as part of the curriculum in NSW's more than 900 public schools, although individual schools may still opt to use it. A further consequence of this shift in policy is that, in 2017, the NSW Department of Education initiated a hiring program to recruit dozens of new literacy and numeracy experts to support teachers in "evidence-based professional learning", according to NSW Minister for Education, Rob Stokes.

New Zealand

After Reading Recovery was removed from the curriculum in many Australian schools, its utility has been questioned by researchers and policy makers in New Zealand as well. By 2019, this had led to reduction in use of Reading Recovery in New Zealand's public schools, and toward a greater emphasis on phonics-based instruction. 
 Parent activism has also contributed to a rise in phonics based instruction and a concomitant decrease in three cueing system based instruction in New Zealand schools.

North America

The Reading Recovery Council of North America, Inc. is a not-for-profit association of Reading Recovery professionals, advocates, and partners. It is an advocate for Reading Recovery throughout North America (United States and Canada). It publishes two journals for this purpose: The Journal of Reading Recovery and Literacy Teaching and Learning.

Reading Recovery and philosophically similar programs are still used in the United States, but there has been significant push back against the approach. Several large school districts have rejected the approach in favor of phonics based instruction. These include Columbus, Ohio, and Bethlehem, Pennsylvania.

On April 23, 2022, the Center for Research in Education and Social Policy at the University of Delaware presented the results of a study of the long-term effects of Reading Recovery. The conclusion was that the "long-term impact estimates were significant and negative". The study found that children who received Reading Recovery had scores on state reading tests in third and fourth grade that were below the test scores of similar children who did not receive Reading Recovery. It suggests three possible hypotheses for this outcome: 
 While Reading Recovery produces large impacts on early literacy measures, it does not give students the required skills for success in later grades; or, 
 The gains are lost because students do not receive sufficient intervention in later grades; or,
 The impacts of the early intervention was washed out by subsequent experiences.

Further reading

Criticism
 Baker, S., Berninger, V. W., Bruck, M., Chapman, J., Eden, G., Elbaum, B., Fletcher, J. M., Fowler, C., Francis, D. J., Fuchs, D., Fuchs, L. S., Greaney, K., Katz, L., Manis, F., Mather, N., McCutchen, D., Mencl, E., Molfese, D. L., Molfese, V., Morris, R., Pugh, K., Prochnow, J., Schatschneider, C., Seidenberg, M., Shaywitz, B., Snow, C., Tunmer, W., Vaughn, S., Vellutino, F. R., Wagner, R., & Wolf, M. (2002). Experts Say Reading Recovery Is Not Effective, Leaves Too Many Children Behind: An Open Letter from Reading Researchers. Retrieved from http://www.wrightslaw.com/info/read.rr.ltr.experts.htm
 Buckingham, J., Reading Recovery a Failed Investment. (2019) CIS Policy Paper. https://fivefromfive.com.au/wp-content/uploads/2019/07/PP15-RE-BRAND.pdf
 Center, Y., Wheldall, K., Freeman, L., Outhred, L., & McNaught, M. (1995). An Evaluation of Reading Recovery. Reading Research Quarterly, 30(2). doi:10.2307/748034
 Chapman, J. W., & Tunmer, W. E. (2009). Recovering Reading Recovery. Australia and New Zealand Journal of Developmental Disabilities, 17(1), 59–71. doi:10.1080/07263869100034271
 Chapman, J. W., & Tunmer, W. E. (2016). Is Reading Recovery an Effective Intervention for Students with Reading Difficulties? A Critique of the i3 Scale-Up Study. Reading Psychology, 37(7), 1025–1042. doi:10.1080/02702711.2016.1157538
 Chapman, J. W., Tunmer, W. E., & Prochnow, J. E. (2001). Does Success in the Reading Recovery Program Depend on Developing Proficiency in Phonological-Processing Skills? A Longitudinal Study in a Whole Language Instructional Context. Scientific Studies of Reading, 5(2), 141–176. doi:10.1207/S1532799Xssr0502_2
 Cook, P., Rodes, D. R., & Lipsitz, K. L. (2017). The Reading Wars and Reading Recovery: What Educators, Families, and Taxpayers Should Know. Learning Disabilities: A Multidisciplinary Journal, 22(2), 12–23. doi:10.18666/ldmj-2017-v22-i2-8391 
 Serry, T. A., & Oberklaid, F. (2014). Children with reading problems: Missed opportunities to make a difference. Australian Journal of Education, 59(1), 22–34. doi:10.1177/0004944114555584

Effectiveness
 Schmitt, M. C., (2001) 'The development of children's strategic processing in Reading Recovery. Reading Psychology, 22 (2), 129–151.
 Phillips, G. and Smith, P. (1997) 'Closing the gaps: Literacy for the hardest to teach'. New Zealand Council for Educational Research: Wellington, 3, 1-36.
 Pinnell, G. S., Lyons, C. A., DeFord, D. E., Bryk, A. S. and Seltzer, M (1994) 'Comparing instructional models for the literacy education of high-risk first graders'. Reading Research Quarterly, 29 (1), 8-39.
 May, H., Gray, A., Sirinides, P., Goldsworthy, H., Armijo, M., Sam, C., ... & Tognatta, N. (2015). Year one results from the multisite randomized evaluation of the i3 scale-up of Reading Recovery. American Educational Research Journal, 52(3), 547–581.

Continued progress
 Hurry, J. and Sylva, K. (2007) 'Long-term outcomes of early reading intervention'. Journal of Reading Research, 30 (3), 227–248.
 Moore, M. and Wade, B. (1998) 'Reading and comprehension: A longitudinal study of ex-Reading Recovery students'. Educational Studies, 24 (2), 195–203.
 Askew, B. J. and Frasier, D. F. (1994) 'Sustained effects of Reading Recovery intervention on the cognitive behaviors of second-grade children and the perceptions of their teachers'. Literacy, Teaching and Learning, 1 (1), 87–107.

Self-esteem
 Department for Education (2011), 'Evaluation of Every Child a Reader (ECaR)', DFE-RR114
 Hummel-Rossi, B & Ashdown, J (2006) 'An investigation of reciprocal effects: Literacy achievement and self-beliefs in first grade children'. International Journal of Learning, 12 (10), 269–276.
 Rumbaugh, W. and Brown, C. (2000) 'The impact of Reading Recovery participation on students' self-concepts'. Reading Psychology, 21 (1), 13–30.

Research reviews
 Schwartz, R. M., Hobsbaum, A., Briggs, C. and Scull, J. (2009) 'Reading Recovery and evidence-based practice: A response to Reynolds and Wheldall (2007)'. International Journal of Disability, Development and Education, 56 (1), 5–15.
 Shanahan, T. and Barr, R. (1995) 'Reading Recovery: An independent evaluation of the effects of an early instructional intervention for at-risk learners.' Reading Research Quarterly, 30 (4), 958–996.

Cost effectiveness
 Schwartz, R.M. Schmitt, M.C. and Lose, M.K. (2012), 'Effects of teacher-student ratio in response to intervention approaches' The Elementary School Journal, 112 (4), 547-567

Audio reports

See also
 List of phonics programs
 Whole language

References

External links
 Reading Recovery Council of North America

Learning
Learning disabilities
Learning to read
Basal readers
Educational psychology
Reading (process)